Nazmabad (also Romanized as Naz̧mābād; also known as Nizāmābād) is a village in Sedeh Rural District, in the Central District of Arak County, Markazi Province, Iran. At the 2006 census, its population was 453, in 139 families.

References 

Populated places in Arak County